Catharanthus coriaceus is a species of flowering plant in the dogbane family, Apocynaceae. It is endemic to Madagascar.

References	

coriaceus
Endemic flora of Madagascar
Plants described in 1970